Teenage Health Freak is a British teen comedy-drama television series, about the life and travails of a socially awkward teenage boy. It was based on the book Diary of a Teenage Health Freak, by Dr. Ann McPherson and Dr. Aidan Macfarlane. The series was directed by Peter Cattaneo.

References

External links

1991 British television series debuts
1993 British television series endings
1990s British comedy-drama television series
1990s British teen television series
1990s high school television series
1990s teen drama television series
British college television series
British high school television series
British teen drama television series
Channel 4 comedy dramas
English-language television shows
British television shows based on children's books
Television series about teenagers
Television series produced at Pinewood Studios
Television shows set in London